The Laguna de Corralero is a lagoon separated from the Pacific Ocean by a near-virgin beach that is also called Corralero. It is located in the State of Oaxaca in the municipality of Santiago Pinotepa Nacional, 27 km south of the municipal seat, (98.12.05 W / 16.11 to 16.15 N) with an extension of 31.58 km² of surface water. 150 km² of landscapes surround the lagoon, and it is good for fishing and birdwatching.

Next to the lagoon is the village of Corralero, with only 5 meters above sea level and 1,301 inhabitants.

References

External links
Map of Laguna de Corralero

Lagoons of Mexico
Landforms of Oaxaca
Pacific Coast of Mexico